Cytisus is a genus of flowering plants in the family Fabaceae, native to open sites (typically scrub and heathland) in Europe, western Asia and North Africa. It belongs to the subfamily Faboideae, and is one of several genera in the tribe Genisteae which are commonly called brooms. They are shrubs producing masses of brightly coloured, pea-like flowers, often highly fragrant. Members of the segregate genera, Calicotome, Chamaecytisus, and Lembotropis are sometimes included in Cytisus.

Species
, Kew's Plants of the World Online listed the following species:

Hybrids and cultivars
, the following hybrids had been described:

 +Laburnocytisus 'Adamii' (Poit.) C. K. Schneid. (Laburnum anagyroides + Chamaecytisus purpureus) (not a true hybrid but a graft-chimera)
 Cytisus × beanii G.Nicholson (Cytisus ardoini × Cytisus purgans)
 Cytisus × czerniaevii Krecz.
 Cytisus × dallimorei Rolfe (Cytisus multiflorus × Cytisus scoparius)
 Cytisus × praecox Beauverd (Cytisus multiflorus × Cytisus purgans)
 Cytisus × syreiszczikowi V.I. Krecz.
 Cytisus × vadasii J.Wagner
 Cytisus × versicolor Dippel (Cytisus hirsutus × Cytisus purpureus)
 Cytisus × virescens Beck
 Cytisus × watereri Wettst.

AGM cultivars
Species have been widely cultivated and hybridised, and the following cultivars have gained the Royal Horticultural Society's Award of Garden Merit:
 Cytisus × beanii  
Cytisus × boskoopii 'Boskoop Ruby' (deep crimson flowers,)
Cytisus × boskoopii 'Zeelandia' (lilac, pink and cream flowers,)
Cytisus 'Burkwoodii' (cerise red or crimson red and yellow edged flowers,)
Cytisus 'Hollandia' (red and pale cream flowers,)
Cytisus × kewensis (Cytisus ardoinii × Cytisus multiflorus; small, prostrate shrub with cream flowers)
Cytisus 'Lena'  
 Cytisus nigricans 'Cyni'  
Cytisus × praecox 'Allgold' (yellow flowers)
Cytisus × praecox 'Warminster'  (pale yellow flowers)

References

 
Taxa named by René Louiche Desfontaines
Fabaceae genera